Johannes Hermanus Petrus "Jan" Lohman (born 18 February 1959) is a Dutch former footballer. He played as a central midfielder, and represented his country at under-21 level. Born in Dussen, North Brabant, Lohman played for several Belgian and Dutch clubs, and also spent five seasons in English football with Watford.

Playing career 

Lohman started his career at Sporting Lokeren in Belgium, and was subsequently loaned to Dutch sides Vlaardingen and NEC Nijmegen. In September 1981, Lohmann transferred to English Second Division team Watford, for a fee of £35,000. In doing so he became the first player to join from outside the Home Nations in the club's 100 year history. Lohman scored in his first Football League game, and Watford were promoted at the end of 1981–82, reaching the First Division for the very first time. Injury restricted Lohman's appearances over the next four years, and by 1986 he had played 81 times for Watford in all competitions, scoring 10 goals.

Lohman was released by Watford at the end of the 1985–86 season, joining Belgian club Germinal Ekeren on a free transfer, before finishing his career with SVV Schiedam and Cappellen FC. He is now retired from football, and works as a barman in Roosendaal in the Netherlands.

References 

1959 births
Living people
People from Dussen
Fortuna Vlaardingen players
NEC Nijmegen players
Watford F.C. players
English Football League players
Netherlands under-21 international footballers
Royal Cappellen F.C. players
Association football midfielders
Dutch footballers
Dutch expatriate footballers
Expatriate footballers in Belgium
Expatriate footballers in England
Footballers from North Brabant
Dutch expatriate sportspeople in England
Dutch expatriate sportspeople in Belgium